Vijayanagara was the capital city of the historic Vijayanagara Empire. Located on the banks of the Tungabhadra River, it spread over a large area and included the modern era Group of Monuments at Hampi site in Vijayanagara district, Bellary district and others in and around these districts in Karnataka, India. A part of Vijayanagara ruins known as Hampi has been designated as a UNESCO world heritage site. Vijayanagara is in the eastern part of central Karnataka, close to the Andhra Pradesh border.

Hampi is an ancient human settlement, mentioned in Hindu texts and has pre-Vijayanagara temples and monuments. In early 14th century, the Deccan region including the dominant Kakatiyas, Seuna Yadavas, Hoysalas and the tiny Kampili kingdom were invaded and plundered by armies of Khalji and later Tughlaq dynasties of the Delhi Sultanate. From these ruins was founded Vijayanagara by the Sangama brothers, who were working as soldiers in Kampli Kingdom under Kampalidevaraya. The city grew rapidly. The Vijayanagara-centred empire functioned as a barrier to the Muslim sultanates in the north, leading to the reconstruction of Hindu life, scholarship, multi-religious activity, rapid infrastructure improvements and economic activity. Along with Hinduism, Vijayanagara accepted communities of other faiths such as Jainism and Islam, leading to multi-religious monuments and mutual influences. Chronicles left by Persian and European travellers state Vijayanagara to be a prosperous and wealthy city. By 1500 CE, Hampi-Vijayanagara was the world's second largest medieval era city (after Beijing) and probably India's richest at that time, attracting traders from Persia and Portugal.

Wars between nearby Muslim Sultanates and Hindu Vijayanagara continued through the 16th century. In 1565, the Vijayanagara leader Aliya Rama Raya was captured and killed, and the city fell to a coalition of Muslim Sultanates of the Deccan. The conquered capital city of Vijayanagara was looted and destroyed for 6 months, after which it remained in ruins.

Location and history

Vijayanagara is located in the modern era Indian state of Karnataka, along the banks of the Tungabhadra River. It is central and eastern part of the state, close to the Andhra Pradesh border. It became the world's second largest city, after Beijing, by about 1500 CE. Estimates of the population vary and are based on the size of the city and number of houses mentioned in the memoirs of foreigners who visited India and wrote about Vijayanagara. Some estimate the population was about 500,000 around 1500 CE, but others consider this estimate to be generous or too conservative.

The capital city was founded around the religious Hindu temple complex, Pampa Tirtha and Kishkinda that already existed at Hampi. The name of the city centre, Hampi, is derived from Pampa, another name of goddess Parvati in Hindu theology. According to Sthala Purana, Parvati (Pampa) pursued her ascetic, yogini lifestyle to win and bring ascetic Shiva back into householder life on the banks of Tungabhadra river, on Hemakuta hill now a part of Hampi. Shiva is also called Pampapati (lit. "husband of Pampa"). The river came to be known as Pampa river. The Sanskrit word Pampa morphed into Kannada word Hampa, and the place Parvati pursued what she wanted came to be known as Hampe or Hampi. Its significance to the Hindus also comes from the Kishkindha chapters of the Hindu epic Ramayana, where Rama and Lakshmana meet Hanuman, Sugriva and the monkey army in their search for kidnapped Sita. Hampi area has many close resemblances between the place described in the epic. The regional tradition believes that it is that place mentioned in the Ramayana, attracting pilgrims.

Prior to its founding, Hindus and kings of various kingdoms visited Hampi. Hoysala Empire's Hindu kings built and supported the Hampi pilgrimage centre before the 14th century. At the start of the 14th century, the armies of Delhi Sultanate, first those of Alauddin Khalji and later of Muhammad bin Tughlaq invaded and pillaged South India. The Hoysala Empire and temple cities such as those in Halebidu, Belur and Somanathapura were plundered in early 14th century. From the ruins of this collapse and destruction emerged Vijayanagara Empire and its new capital Vijayanagara. The city was founded by Harihara I and Bukka, the Sangama brothers.

The city was already a sacred site of pilgrimage for devotees of Shiva in the 10th century. It became the most powerful urban centre in the Deccan between 14th to 16th centuries and one of the ten largest cities of the world. The Renaissance Portuguese and Persian traders reported it as a marvellous achievement.

The city was a powerful urban centre in South India from 14th to 16th century and one of the ten largest cities of the world. It stood as a bastion of Hindu values dedicated to fighting back the encroachments of the Muslim sultans from the north, who soon came to be operating from Golkonda. The Sangama dynasty was involved in repeated conflicts with the Bahamani Sultanate. The Bahamanis had later disintegrated into five sultanates which formed a Deccan alliance. Krishnadevaraya after the Battle of Raichur allowed one sultan to stay in power rather than let it split into smaller kingdoms. However, later Vijayanagara kings had to contend with multiple Sultanates to their north. The Vijayanagara kingdom befriended and allowed the Portuguese to take control of Goa and western territories of the Bahamani Sultanate. The sultanates united against the Vijayanagara Empire.

It resulted in the capture and beheading of Vijayanagara leader Aliya Rama Raya, mass confusion within the Vijayanagara forces and a shock defeat. The Sultanate army then reached Vijayanagara, looted, destroyed and burnt it down to ruins over a period of several months. This is evidenced by the quantities of charcoal, the heat-cracked basements and burnt architectural pieces found by archaeologists in Vijayanagara region. The urban Vijayanagara was abandoned and remained in ruins ever since. Vijayanagara never recovered from the ruins.

The Italian Cesare Federici writing two years after the empire's defeat states that "The Citie of Bezeneger (Vijayanagara) is not altogether destroyed, yet the houses stand still, but empty, and there is dwelling in them nothing, as is reported, but Tygres and other wild beasts."

Archaeological evidence suggests that while the urban settlement was abandoned, a number of rural settlement in the metropolitan region were not fully emptied. Some population remained in the region (though there isn't a good assessment of how much), and a number of settlements founded in the Vijayanagara period remain occupied up to the present.

Description

The name translates as "City of Victory", from vijaya (victory) and nagara (city). As the prosperous capital of the largest and most powerful kingdom of its time in South India, Vijayanagara attracted people from all around the world.

The ruined city is a World Heritage Site, known in that context as the Ruins of Hampi. In recent years there have been concerns regarding damage to the site at Hampi from heavy vehicular traffic and the construction of road bridges in the vicinity. Hampi was listed as a "threatened" World Heritage Site by the UNESCO but was later removed from the list after appropriate corrective measures were taken.

Traveller memoirs before 1565 CE record it as a large and developed metropolitan area. The Italian Cesari Federici writing two years after the Vijayanagara Empire's military defeat in 1565 describes the city after its ruin, "...is not altogether destroyed, yet the houses stand still, but emptie [sic], and there is dwelling in them nothing, as is reported, but Tygres and other wild beasts."

Recent commentaries state:

"The massive walls, which can still be traced, enclosed an area of more than sixty square miles, much of which was occupied by fields and gardens watered by canals from the river. The population cannot be estimated with precision, but it was certainly very large when judged by the standards of the fifteenth century. The great majority of the houses were naturally small and undistinguished, but among them were scattered palaces, temples, public buildings, wide streets of shops shaded by trees, busy markets, and all the equipment of a great and wealthy city. The principal buildings were constructed in the regular Hindu style, covered with ornamental carving, and the fragments which have survived suffice to give point to the enthusiastic admiration of the men who saw the city in the days of its magnificence."

Sanjay Subrahmanyam states that Vijayanagara was arguably one of the only three centres during this period with a population of over 100,000 in South India and that from the contemporary accounts and what remains of its expanse, the city proper and the suburbs had a population of 500,000 to 600,000. He notes that Domingo Paes had estimated its size at 100,000 houses.

Area
Vijayanagara includes:
Hampi, now UNESCO World Heritage Site.
Anegundi, on the north side of the Tungabhadra River, in Koppal district.
Kamalapura, a small temple town to the southeast of the Royal Centre, also houses an archaeological museum.
Hospet, a town and railhead, to the southwest.
Monuments spread Ballari and nearby districts.

The Karnataka Cabinet approved the decade-old demand of carving out Vijayanagara district from the existing Ballari district. Vijayanagara will be the 31st district of the State.

See also

 Vijayanagara architecture
 List of colossal sculpture in situ
 List of largest monoliths in the world
 Sayana
 Allasani Peddana

Notes

 Vijayanagara kaalada Sainyavyavasthe matthu Yuddhanithi, Dr.S.Y.Somashekhar, 2009, Sanchike Prakashana, Kannada University, Hampi, Vidyaranya, 583 276, Bellary Dist.
 Karnatakada Birudaavaligalu, Dr.S.Y.Somashekhar, 2014, Prasaranga, Kannada University, Hampi, Vidyaranya, 583 276, Bellary Dist.
 Sosale Srinivasachar & T.S. Satyan, Hampi: The fabled capital of the Vijayanagara Empire, (Directorate of Archaeology and Museums), Govt. of Karnataka, 1995
 J.M. Fritz et al., New Light on Hampi: Recent Research at Vijayanagara, (Performing Arts Mumbai, 2001) 
 A.H. Longhurst, Hampi Ruins Described and Illustrated, (Laurier Books Ltd., 1998) 
 The Ruins of Hampi:Travel Guide 
 Raghu Rai & Usha Rai, Vijayanagara Empire: Ruins to Resurrection, New Delhi, 2014.

References

Bibliography

External links

 Vijayanagara Research Project
 Krishna temple complex and Vittala temple complex

Vijayanagara Empire
Former populated places in India
Former capital cities in India
Hampi
Archaeological sites in Karnataka
World Heritage Sites in India
Ruins in India
Destroyed cities